The Portrait of Jacopo Strada is a 1567-68 portrait of the court librarian Jacopo Strada by Titian, now held in the Kunsthistorisches Museum in Vienna.

Strada was not only an official book keeper, but also had many other qualities, and this portrait portrays him in his study surrounded by objects displaying his knowledge. He is shown wearing a gold chain, probably awarded him the previous year 1566 when he was appointed Antiquarius Caesareus by his employer Maximilian II, Holy Roman Emperor.

The inscription upper right reads JACOBVUS DE STRADA CIVIS ROMANVS CAESS. ANTIQVARIVS ET COM. BELIC. AN: AETAT: LI: et C.M.D.L. XVI (Jacopo de Strada, citizen of Rome, imperial Antiquary and Minister, aged 51 in the year 1566). The painting is signed top left: "TITIANVS F (ECIT)". The letter on the table additionally contains the words Titian Vecellio Venezia.

A century later this painting was documented in David Teniers the Younger's catalog Theatrum Pictorium of the art collection of Archduke Leopold Wilhelm in 1659 and again in 1673, but the portrait had already enjoyed notoriety in Teniers' portrayals of the Archduke's art collection:

References

 Urbanissime Strada: Jacopo Strada and Cultural Patronage at the Imperial Court, by Jansen, Dirk Jacob, 2015

1568 paintings
Strada, Jacopo
Paintings in the collection of the Kunsthistorisches Museum
Strada, Jacopo
Paintings in the collection of the Archduke Leopold Wilhelm of Austria